Krasnaya Zarya is a rural locality (a village) in Usen-Ivanovsky Selsoviet, Belebeyevsky District, Bashkortostan, Russia. The population was 39 as of 2010. There is 1 street.

Geography 
Krasnaya Zarya is located 27 km northeast of Belebey (the district's administrative centre) by road. Sosnovy Bor is the nearest rural locality.

References 

Rural localities in Belebeyevsky District